Svensk mediedatabas (Swedish Media Database) is a search engine for the audiovisual works of the National Library of Sweden.

The database contains data about TV, radio, video, movies that have been shown in cinemas, gramophone records, CDs, cassette tapes, video games and multimedia. The SMDB contains most Swedish broadcasts and publications since 1979, but also older works. There is an almost complete list of Swedish gramophone records starting from the end of the 19th century. The SMDB also contains information about special collections such as older advertisement films and video recordings from Swedish theatres.

, the database contains information about nearly eight million hours of audiovisual content.

Database
The database contains information about the following, starting from 1979:

TV and radio broadcasts by Sveriges Radio, Sveriges Television, Utbildningsradion and TV4
TV shows that have been broadcast using Swedish digital terrestrial television or satellite broadcasts originating from Sweden
A selection of some local TV and radio broadcasts
Movies that have been shows in cinemas in Sweden
Video that has been distributed in Sweden
Swedish phonorecords, that is, published and unpublished sound recordings
Swedish interactive multimedia with sound or motion pictures

References

External links 
Svensk mediedatabas

Swedish film websites
Databases in Sweden
Online film databases
2008 establishments in Sweden